DGU may refer to:
 Defensive gun use
 Dictionary of general usage
 Dongguk University, South Korea